Geer v. Connecticut, 161 U.S. 519 (1896), was a United States Supreme Court decision, which dealt with the transportation of wild fowl over state lines. Geer held that the states owned the wild animals within their borders and could strictly regulate their management and harvest. According to the Geer Court, “the right to preserve game flows from the undoubted existence in the State of a police power.” Although this statement is often quoted by state advocates, it is followed by the qualification that this power reaches only “in so far as its exercise may not be incompatible with, or restrained by, the rights conveyed to the Federal government by the Constitution.” The Geer decision supported the view that the states owned all resident wildlife, but at the time there were no conflicting federal wildlife laws.

See also
List of United States Supreme Court cases, volume 161
Live export
Missouri v. Holland, 
Hunt v. United States, 
Kleppe v. New Mexico,

References

Further reading

External links
 
 

United States Supreme Court cases
United States Supreme Court cases of the Fuller Court
1890s in the environment
1896 in United States case law
United States land use case law
1896 in Connecticut
Legal history of Connecticut